Md. Shafiqul Islam (born 9 August 1952) is a Bangladesh Awami League politiciansand a former Jatiya Sangsad member representing the Sirajganj-4 constituency.

References

1952 births
Living people
People from Sirajganj District
Awami League politicians
9th Jatiya Sangsad members